Elisabeth of Lorraine (9 October 1574 – 4 January 1635), was a Duchess and an Electress consort of Bavaria by marriage to Maximilian I, Elector of Bavaria.   She had no children, which caused a succession crisis, but her personal relationship with Maximilian was good, and while she had no political influence, she was noted to be devoted and charitable.

Life

Elisabeth was a daughter of Charles III, Duke of Lorraine in his marriage to Claude of Valois. 

On 9 February 1595, in Nancy, she married her cousin Maximilian I, Elector of Bavaria. The marriage was arranged to confirm the alliance between the two Catholic dynasties of Bavaria and Lorraine and give Bavaria connections to France and Tuscany, her sister being married to the Grand Duke of Tuscany. Her spouse came in to power in Bavaria in 1597. 

The marriage was childless due to Elisabeth's sterility, which was a cause of suffering. Her relationship to her spouse was described as good and harmonious despite fertility issues. But the childlessnes became a political failure due to the Bavarian succession not being secured.   

Elisabeth is described as a very devout Catholic, who devoted a lot of her time to her religious duties, and became known for her ascetic life style. As newly married, she was seen as vivid and jolly, but she became more melancholic and depressive by age. Maximilian gave no political influence or tasks to Elisabeth, but she spent a great deal of effort on charity. 

She died after a long period of illness. Because her marriage had not resulted in any issue, Maximilian married again only a few months after her death, eventually siring the long awaited heir to his Electorate.

Ancestry

See also
Dukes of Lorraine family tree

References

|-

|-

1574 births
1635 deaths
Electresses of the Palatinate
Duchesses of Bavaria
Electresses of Bavaria
Nobility from Nancy, France
Princesses of Lorraine
Burials at St. Michael's Church, Munich